Alicia Brown (born January 21, 1990, in Ottawa, Ontario) is a Canadian track and field athlete competing in the sprint events, predominantly the 400m event.

Brown represented Canada at the 2016 and 2020 Summer Olympics as part of the 4x400 m relay team. Both times the Canadian team finished in fourth place.

Brown was banned from competition during a two-year period starting in November 2013 by the Canadian Centre for Ethics in Sport following a doping violation caused by a positive hydrochlorothiazide test.

References

External links
 
 

1990 births
Living people
Black Canadian female track and field athletes
Canadian people of Jamaican descent
Canadian female sprinters
Athletes from Ottawa
Athletes (track and field) at the 2016 Summer Olympics
Olympic track and field athletes of Canada
World Athletics Championships athletes for Canada
Universiade medalists in athletics (track and field)
Universiade silver medalists for Canada
Canadian Track and Field Championships winners
Medalists at the 2013 Summer Universiade
Athletes (track and field) at the 2020 Summer Olympics
Olympic female sprinters